Quyết Thắng may refer to several places in Vietnam, including:

Quyết Thắng, Biên Hòa, a ward of Biên Hòa
Quyết Thắng, Kon Tum, a ward of Kon Tum
Quyết Thắng, Lai Châu, a ward of Lai Châu